The Glenelg River, a perennial river of the Glenelg Hopkins catchment, is located in the Australian states of Victoria and South Australia.

A short stretch of the lower end winds through southeastern South Australia before returning to Victoria to enter Discovery Bay at Nelson. The Glenelg River is a central feature of the Lower Glenelg National Park.

The river was named after Colonial Secretary Baron Glenelg, Charles Grant, by Major Thomas Mitchell in August 1836.

Large amounts of water diverted from the upper reaches of the river for agricultural purposes, including irrigation and town water demands.

History

Aboriginal history
The Glenelg was important to Indigenous Australians.  It formed the traditional tribal boundaries for the Bungandidj people (western bank) and Gunditjmara people (eastern bank) people from two distinct language groups.  Little archeological evidence has been found of Bunganditj inhabitation along the banks of the river, including in regional caves. However, there is strong evidence of their presence further towards the coastal areas. While strong evidence of Gunditjmara activity has been found along the river's eastern hinterland and shell middens discovered may indicate multiple nomadic tribes camping along the river that may have used message sticks to communicate.  It is not known how long indigenous Australians had been associated with the river, however it is estimated to have been many thousands of years.

European history
Major Thomas Mitchell was the first European to visit and cross the river in August 1836, noting its width and its suitability for boating, naming it for Colonial Secretary Baron Glenelg, Charles Grant.  A cenotaph at Nelson marks the crossing point. The first Europeans arrived in 1840.  Thomas Ricketts moved from the Barwon River to the Glenelg and established "Clunie" on its southern boundary.  Historians noted the hostility of the Indigenous people of the area who drove Ricketts out of the settlement and conflicted with many others.  Addison and Murray from Van Diemen's Land set up the sheep run Dunrobin in January, 1840 after which more than half a dozen squatters others followed, and by the end of the year, many properties had river frontages and the population grew gradually thereafter.

A punt built in 1848 by Henry Kellett at Nelson was the first permanent crossing of the river. In 1860 a body of Mr Hunt and his wife were discovered under a bridge at Casterton, after which Mr Waines was subsequently tried and hanged for the murder. On 1 July 1861, at Chetwynd station, a large tornado occurred reportedly killing a man. In 1866, one of the earliest artists depictions of the river by engraver Frederick Grosse "View of the River Glenelg, South Australia" was published depicting boating among its steep limestone cliffs. The earliest crossings over the Glenelg were at Casterton.  The first crossing over the wider reaches of the lower Glenelg was constructed out of wood in 1893 in Nelson.  It was replaced by the current steel cantilever bridge in 1963.

Location and features
The river flows north through swampland before heading west, transversed by the Henty Highway, and then south where the river is impounded by the Rocklands Reservoir, formed by a concretewalled gravity dam with embankment sections constructed in 1953. The Glenelg flows generally southwest, to the west of Dergholm State Park towards Dergholm, joined by a number of minor tributaries. From here the river flows south by east, through the town of Casterton, and south of which the  Wannon River forms its confluence with the Glenelg. Flowing south by west, the Glenelg flows through the Wilkin Flora and Fauna Reserve before heading due south, met by the Stokes River prior to flowing through the town of  where the Crawford River forms its confluence with the Glenelg. Flowing south, then sharply west and crossing the state border into South Australia, the Glenelg flows through  before heading east back into Victoria. The river reaches its mouth at Nelson and much of the latter course is through the Lower Glenelg National Park. From its highest point, the Glenelg River descends , joined by thirtytwo named tributaries over its  course.

Communities and significant crossings along the river

There are many crossings over the Glenelg River, including road, rail and pedestrian. Some additional roads allow passage through shallow sections of the river when the water levels are low.

Glenelg River Canoe Trail 
The Glenelg River Canoe Trail can be found through the lower reaches of the river. Starting in Dartmoor, there is a stretch of flat water approximately 75 kilometres long, eventually ending in Nelson.

Flora and fauna 
The Glenelg River mussel, once plentiful but now critically endangered, lives in small populations along the river. Work is being done to improve its habitat, after it was further threatened by the bushfires in 2019-2020.

Populations of a local fish known as the tupong (Pseudaphritis urvillii) started to recover in the 2010s, after the health of the river had been significantly improved after more than a century of environmental degradation caused by the introduction of agriculture. Two Australian grayling were observed in early 2021, the first recorded sighting since 1899, and scientists are hopeful that they will make a similar comeback.

See also

 Great South West Walk
 List of rivers of Australia

References

External links
 
 
 

Glenelg Hopkins catchment
Rivers of Barwon South West (region)
Rivers of Grampians (region)
Rivers of South Australia
Western District (Victoria)
Wimmera
Grampians (national park)
Limestone Coast